Lu Sheng (November 5, 1911 – September 23, 1997) was a People's Liberation Army lieutenant general. He was born in Qionghai, Hainan Province (then part of Guangdong Province).

1911 births
1997 deaths
People's Liberation Army generals from Hainan
People from Qionghai